William Iwan Jenkins-Davies (born 22 October 2004) is a professional footballer who plays as a midfielder for  club Plymouth Argyle, and the Wales national under-18 team.

Early life and education
Jenkins-Davies attended Torquay Boys' Grammar School.

Club career
He joined Plymouth Argyle's academy at under-nine level. He made his professional debut on 31 August 2021 as a substitute in a 2–0 EFL Trophy defeat to Newport County. He signed his first professional contract with the club on 22 October 2021, his 17th birthday. He made his league debut as a late substitute in a 4–1 win away to Accrington Stanley on 13 November.

International career
Jenkins-Davies scored on his debut for the Wales national under-16 team in October 2019 after coming on as a substitute in a 4–0 win over Republic of Ireland. He was called up to the Wales under-17 side for the first time in March 2021. He received a call-up to the Wales under-18 team in September 2021.

References

External links

2004 births
English footballers
Welsh footballers
Wales youth international footballers
Association football midfielders
Plymouth Argyle F.C. players
English Football League players
People educated at Torquay Boys' Grammar School
Living people